A City Is Not a Tree is a widely cited  1965 essay (later published as a book) by the architect and design theorist Christopher Alexander, first published in the journal Architectural Forum, and re-published many times since.  In 2015 the essay was published as a book including new exegesis commentaries on the original essay from other architects, engineers and physicists.  A City is Not a Tree has been widely described as a landmark text, and the Resource for Urban Design Information calls it "one of the classic references in the literature of the built environment and related fields". In 2016 a 50th Anniversary edition was published by Sustasis Press/Off the Common Books.

Its core contention is that urban planners tend to design cities as tree diagrams (with each node only having a relationship with a parent node), while successful unplanned cities have a semi-lattice structure (where each node has relationships with many nodes).

References

1965 essays
Academic works about architecture